Joseph John Moore (January 12, 1901 – April 1982) was an American speed skater who competed in the 1924 Winter Olympics. He finished eighth in the 500 m and 1500 m, and twelfth in the 10000 m event.

Moore competed from 1917 to 1927, in the New York – New Jersey area, and won more than 15 major all-around titles, including the 1921 Eastern Championships and the 1927 Long Island Championships. He never won the national all-around title, finishing second in 1923, but he won the Canadian all-around title in 1922. In 1921, he was briefly banned from amateur competitions because his name was used in commercial advertisements.

References

1901 births
1982 deaths
American male speed skaters
Olympic speed skaters of the United States
Speed skaters at the 1924 Winter Olympics